The West Indies cricket team toured England for a two-match Test series and a three-match ODI series from 6 to 26 May 2009. They toured in place of Zimbabwe.

At the start of the summer, the English players at a meeting identified this West Indian visit as pivotal to their momentum-making efforts for the Ashes later that season.

Test series

Squads

1st Test

Day 1: Ravi Bopara made his second century (at 207 balls), and England closed the day with 289/7. Fidel Edwards took 4 wickets for 53 runs.
Day 2: England closed the first innings with 377 runs. West Indies only scored 152 runs in their innings, and Strauss enforced the follow on. West Indies closed the day with 39/2. Graham Onions, on his Test debut, took 5 wickets for 38 runs.
Day 3 The West Indies finally ended their second innings with a lead of 31 runs. England quickly reached this target, and won the first Test in a series for the first time in 15 attempts. This was also the first win at Lord's since 2005. Chanderpaul ended the match with only 4 runs and a duck, his lowest match total in his career.

2nd Test

Day 1: England won the toss and elected bat. Bopara and Cook scored centuries (108 & 126* respectly). Bopara scored his third consecutive century (all vs West Indies); he is the first Englishman since Graham Gooch in 1990 to achieve this feat. England closed the day on 302 for 2.
Day 2: There was no play on the second day because of rain.
Day 3: Alastair Cook closed his innings with 160 runs, his highest test score, and led to England to 569 for 6, before the declaration by Strauss. West Indies closed the day on 94 for 3, Anderson took 3 wickets for 28 runs.
Day 4: After tea, West Indies ended their second innings with 310 runs and Strauss enforced the follow-on, for the second time in the series. In 22 overs, West Indies scored 115 runs for 3 wickets.
Day 5: After showers limited play at the beginning of the day, England bowled the West Indies out for 176 by the third over after lunch. Paul Collingwood replaced the injured Matt Prior as wicketkeeper, and Anderson took 4 wickets while conceding just 18 runs.

ODI series

1st ODI

The first ODI was abandoned at 15:00, after torrential morning rain left the newly relaid outfield saturated.

2nd ODI 

England won the toss and chose to field, bowling strongly and defensively, with Stuart Broad taking four for 46 and Paul Collingwood three for 16 from six overs.  Graeme Swann, the England off-spinner, described as "exceptional" the efforts of his seam-bowling counterparts. Shivnarine Chanderpaul and Dwayne Bravo made the best partnership of the West Indian innings with 63 runs for the fourth wicket. Collingwood was unbeaten on 47 in England's innings, as they won the game with 14 overs to spare. The West Indian captain Chris Gayle played his 200th ODI. Eoin Morgan played his first match with England, he previously played 23 One Day Internationals with Ireland.

3rd ODI 

The Englishmen were delighted to bat first, keen as they were to put themselves to the test in the total-setting stakes, and passed with something like aplomb.  Swann was especially impressed with and pleased for Matt Prior, whose 87 he dubbed "brilliant". Prior had previously been picked apart for his persistent failure to convert starts into substantial scores.  Swann also drew attention to the fact that this constituted England's second successive win without both Kevin Pietersen and Andrew Flintoff, and opined that the team was beginning to look "formidable", having amply fulfilled its goals for the series.  "D-day is now looming," he wrote in reference to the Ashes.  "I can't wait!"

Tour Matches

First Class: Leicestershire vs West Indians

First Class: Essex vs West Indians

First Class: England Lions vs West Indians

References

2009 in English cricket
2009
International cricket competitions in 2009